The 2008 South American Cross Country Championships took place on March 2, 2008.  The races were held at the Parque Ñu Guazú in Asunción, Paraguay.  A detailed report of the event was given for the IAAF.

Complete results and results for junior and youth competitions were published.

Medallists

Race results

Senior men's race (12 km)

Note: Athletes in parentheses did not score for the team result..  (n/s: nonscorer)
†: One of two athletes was a nonscorer.

Junior (U20) men's race (8 km)

Note: Athletes in parentheses did not score for the team result.  (n/s: nonscorer)

Youth (U18) men's race (4 km)

Note: Athletes in parentheses did not score for the team result. (n/s: nonscorer)

Senior women's race (8 km)

Note: Athletes in parentheses did not score for the team result. (n/s: nonscorer)

Junior (U20) women's race (6 km)

Note: Athletes in parentheses did not score for the team result. (n/s: nonscorer)

Youth (U18) women's race (3 km)

Note: Athletes in parentheses did not score for the team result. (n/s: nonscorer)

Medal table (unofficial)

Note: Totals include both individual and team medals, with medals in the team competition counting as one medal.

Participation
According to an unofficial count, 91 athletes from 7 countries participated.  This is in agreement with the official numbers as published.

 (19)
 (2)
 (23)
 (9)
 (21)
 Perú (9)
 (8)

See also
 2008 in athletics (track and field)

References

South American Cross Country Championships
South American Cross Country Championships
2008
South American Cross Country Championships
Cross country running in Paraguay
2000s in Asunción
International sports competitions in Asunción
March 2008 sports events in South America